Nathan Wilson may refer to:

Nathan Wilson (politician) (1758–1834), American politician
N. D. Wilson (born 1978), American author
Nathan Wilson (footballer) (born 1993), Australian rules footballer from Western Australia
Nathan Wilson (cinematographer) for The Trouble with Romance
Nathan Wilson (cyclist) in 2013 USA Pro Cycling Challenge